A Real Good Kid is the third studio album by American singer Mike Posner, released on January 18, 2019, through Universal Island. It was announced by Posner on social media on November 21, 2018. It was recorded by Posner over a two-year period. It was supported by the singles "Song About You", "Stuck in the Middle" and "Move On". To "celebrate" the release of the album, Posner will walk across the United States from the Atlantic Ocean to the Pacific Ocean from March 2019.

Background
In the two-year period that the album was recorded, Posner was dealing with the end of a relationship, then moved back to Detroit to care for his terminally ill father, who later died of brain cancer, and his friend Avicii committed suicide. Posner said: "I had to go to the studio everyday and I was trying to just show up and record all the songs and do a good job and I was sad." In a press statement, Posner said the album "deals heavily with love, loss and eventual acceptance". The album includes recordings of Mike's father.

Track listing

Charts

References

2019 albums
Mike Posner albums